is a town located in Kitamorokata District, Miyazaki Prefecture, Japan. As of October 1, 2019, the town has an estimated population of 25,591 and the density of 231 persons per km². The total area is 110.02 km². In October 2022, it was ranked as the best town to live in in Miyazaki Prefecture.

Geography

Neighbouring municipalities 

 Miyazaki Prefecture
 Miyazaki
 Miyakonojō
 Nichinan

Transportation
The primary form of transportation in Mimata is the car. There is one train station in Mimata and it is on the Nippō Main Line of Kyushu Railway Company (JR Kyushu).

Attractions 
 is famous for its Azalea Festival.  This happens in April of every year during the Hanami season.  Shiibae is located only 12 km from the JR Mimata Station.
 is located only 8 km from the JR Mimata Station.  It is approximately 10 minutes by car.
 is located in the center of a local park.  It was built in 1942.  It is located 4 km from the JR Mimata Station.  It is nicknamed  which means "glasses bridge".  This is because it looks like a pair of eyeglasses when it is reflected in the water.

Education 
Primary:
Mimata Elementary School
Mimata West Elementary School
Katsuoka Elementary School
Kajiyama Elementary School
Miyamura Elementary School
Nagata Elementary School
Secondary:
Mimata Junior High School
East Miyakonojo High School

Mimata Junior High School 

This is currently the largest junior high in all of Miyazaki Prefecture and in 2006 was the 3rd largest school Secondary Education School in the prefecture.

East Miyakonojō High School 

Mimata does not have any public high schools.  Within its boundaries is East Miyakonojō High School which is a privately run.  It is called East Miyakonojō High School because the private funding comes from Miyakonojō.

Because of the sheer size of Mimata Junior High School, many students do not get admitted to East Miyakonojō High School.  They take a train from Mimata Station or bike to other nearby high schools either in Miyakonojō proper or other neighboring towns.

References

External links

Official website 

Towns in Miyazaki Prefecture